The Méliès d'Or is an award presented annually by the Méliès International Festivals Federation (MIFF), an international network of genre film festivals from Europe. The Méliès d'Or was introduced in 1996 for science fiction, fantasy, and horror films. The award is named after film director Georges Méliès (1861-1938).

Two directors have won the award twice—Álex de la Iglesia and Anders Thomas Jensen. The most awarded country is Spain with seven awards, followed by Denmark and the United Kingdom with four. As of 2022, Piggy is the most recent winner.

Winners

See also
 Speculative fiction
 List of fantasy awards

References

External links

Méliès d'Or Winners. Méliès International Festivals Federation. Retrieved 30 January 2021.

Awards established in 1995
Awards for best film
European film awards
Georges Méliès
Speculative fiction awards
1995 establishments in Belgium